Lynn Austin is the American author of many Christian fiction novels and holds the record for most Christy Awards won: eight. One of her books, Hidden Places was turned into a Hallmark Channel movie. She and her husband have three children and live in Holland, Michigan.

Background
Austin began her writing career as a reader. She did not like the feeling of hopelessness she was often left with and sought to write what she would want to read. "I agree that life is hard--but God is good!" With only a minor in English she sat down to write, and continued to write, while juggling in between raising her children and working part-time. Her family moved from Canada to Chicago, where she taught at Chicago Christian High School one year before beginning to write full-time and actively pursued getting published. It took eleven years from when she started writing to getting published.

Writing philosophy
Austin is known for writing books about strong women that don't need to be rescued by a hero. She responded to readers about this by stating, "Although I don't consciously set out to create strong women, I'd like to think that the women in my stories find strength by trusting in God."

She says she never starts a story with a particular theme in mind, but rather starts by trying to tell a story and let the Christian message fall into place. The theme of the books may be different, but the central message she tries to get across in all her novels is "that God loves us and He'll never forsake us no matter how difficult life becomes."

"I love to draw my inspiration from the lives of real people," she says. She does this by peppering her research of historic events with diaries, letters, and first-hand accounts of people who lived through these events and times. She also gets inspiration from listening to stories about and from modern people.

Published works

Series

Chronicles of the Kings
Gods and Kings (originally published The Lord Is My Strength) (1995)
Song of Redemption (originally published The Lord Is My Song) (1996)
The Strength of His Hand (originally published The Lord Is My Salvation) (1996)
Faith of My Fathers (originally published My Father's God) (1997)
Among the Gods (1998)

Refiner's Fire 

Candle in the Darkness (2002) Christy Award winner
Fire By Night (2003) Christy Award winner
A Light to My Path (2004)

The Restoration Chronicles 
Return to Me (2013)
Keepers of the covenant (2014)
On This Foundation (due out October 2015)

Stand alone novels 

Fly Away (2017)
Eve's Daughters (1999)
Wings of Refuge (2000)
Hidden Places (2001) Christy Award winner
All She Ever Wanted (2005)
A Woman's Place (2006)
A Proper Pursuit (2007) Christy Award winner
Until We Reach Home (2008) Christy Award winner
Though Waters Roar (2009) Christy Award winner
While We're Far Apart (2010) Christy Award winner
Wonderland Creek (2011) Christy Award winner
All Things New (2012)
Waves of Mercy (2016)

Where We Belong (2017)

Legacy of Mercy (2018)

Nonfiction
Pilgrimage: My Journey to a Deeper Faith in the Land Where Jesus Walked (2013)

References

External links
Author's website
Publisher's website
Fantastic Fiction
Library Thing

Living people
American women novelists
American romantic fiction writers
Christian novelists
Southern Connecticut State University alumni
1949 births
American historical novelists
Writers of historical romances
20th-century American novelists
21st-century American novelists
Women romantic fiction writers
20th-century American women writers
21st-century American women writers
Women historical novelists